P. Aisha Potty (Malayalam: പി. ആയിഷാ പോറ്റി‌‌) is an Indian politician and the former MLA of Kottarakkara since 2006. Daughter of Shri N. Vasudevan Potty and Smt. N.J. Parvathy Antharjanam, Aisha Potty is member of All India Lawyers Union National Council. She is also the convener of State Women’s Sub Committee. She won the 2016 assembly election with a huge majority of more than 42,000 votes. She holds a masters degree in Law (LLM).

References 

Living people
People from Kollam district
Communist Party of India (Marxist) politicians from Kerala
Kerala MLAs 2006–2011
1958 births